The 1935 Washington Huskies football team was an American football team that represented the University of Washington during the 1935 college football season. In its sixth season under head coach Jimmy Phelan, the team compiled a 5–3 record, finished in sixth place in the Pacific Coast Conference, and outscored all opponents by a combined total of 93 to 42. Dan Lazarevich was the team captain.

Schedule

References

Washington
Washington Huskies football seasons
Washington Huskies football